Sayn-Wittgenstein-Berleburg-Ludwigsburg, also known as Sayn-Wittgenstein-Ludwigsburg, was a cadet branch of the Sayn-Wittgenstein-Berleburg family.

History 
It was created by Graf Casimir zu Sayn-Wittgenstein-Berleburg (1687–1741, ruled 1694–1741) for his youngest brother, Count Ludwig Franz (1694–1750). Its seat was Ludwigsburg, a spectacular two-winged manor house in Berleburg built by the master builder Mannus Riedesel.

The branch had no territorial holdings of its own and as such had no independent standing in the German Empire. Later generations flourished as officers for the Czar of Russia. The family was raised to the rank of Prince in 1834 by Frederick William III. After their return to Germany in the first half of the 19th century, this line of the family came in to possession of Sayn Castle and Sayn Palace in Bendorf and due to that they officially became Princes of Sayn-Wittgenstein-Sayn in 1861. With the revolutions and wars of the 20th century, descendants were dispersed throughout Europe and North America.

Counts and Princes of Sayn-Wittgenstein-Ludwigsburg
 Ludwig Franz (1700–1750)
 Christian Louis Casimir (1750–1797)
 Ludwig Adolf Peter (1797–1843), raised to the rank of Fürst in 1834 by King Frederick William III of Prussia

References